This page shows results of Canadian federal elections in Hamilton, Burlington, and the Niagara Region.

Regional profile
This is arguably the most competitive region in Ontario and one of the most competitive in all of Canada, as all three major parties have significant strength. Traditionally a conservative-leaning area outside of Hamilton and Welland, the Conservatives won the majority of seats in the 1970s and  1980s, aside from 1974 when the Liberals did well, taking six of nine. 
Before that the Liberals had dominated the area in the 1960s and from 1940 to 1953 with the Conservatives dominating in the two late 1950s elections and in the 1920s and 1930s.

The entire area went for the Liberals in their sweeps of Ontario from 1993 to 2000, with the popularity of local left-leaning Liberal Sheila Copps and the prominence of her parents (Victor and Geraldine) at the municipal level in Hamilton being major factors.

Some of this changed in 2004, the year that happened to coincide with Sheila Copps' departure from federal politics. In Hamilton proper, the New Democratic Party managed to pick up one seat from the Liberals in 2004 and picked up two more in 2006 to sweep urban Hamilton. The Conservatives picked up two seats from the Liberals in 2004 and four more in 2006, leaving the Liberals with only Welland in 2006.

The 2008 and 2011 elections saw the Liberals shutout of the area as the NDP retained its stronghold in Hamilton and added Welland from the Liberals for four seats. The Conservatives claimed the other six ridings in the area each election from 2006 to 2011.

In the 2015 Liberal election victory, the  Conservatives held the three most rural ridings plus Niagara Falls, while the NDP retained two of its Hamilton seats, the two fully within the city, but lost its Welland seat (realigned and renamed to Niagara Centre) to the Liberals who claimed the other five seats in the area.

In recent decades, the Liberals have support throughout the region, but no real stronghold of support, which means there are no real safe seats for the party in this area. Several ridings are competitive 3-way districts most elections, although Hamilton's four seats and Niagara Centre generally switch between the Liberals and NDP..

2015, 42nd General Election

2011, 41st General Election

2008, 40th General Election

2006, 39th General Election

2004, 38th General Election

|-
|bgcolor=whitesmoke|Ancaster—Dundas—Flamborough—Westdale
||
|Russ Powers21,93539.69%
|
|David Sweet19,13534.63%
|
|Gordon Guyatt11,55720.91%
|
|David Januczkowski2,6364.77%
|
|
|
|
||
|John Bryden§1
|-
|bgcolor=whitesmoke|Burlington
||
|Paddy Torsney27,42344.96%
|
|Mike Wallace23,38938.35%
|
|David Carter Laird6,58110.79%
|
|Angela Reid3,1695.20%
|
|John Herman Wubs4290.70%
|
|
||
|Paddy Torsney
|-
|bgcolor=whitesmoke|Halton
||
|Gary Carr27,36248.35%
|
|Dean Martin21,70438.35%
|
|Anwar Naqvi4,6428.20%
|
|Frank Marchetti2,8895.10%
|
|
|
|
||
|Julian Reed†
|-
|rowspan=2 bgcolor=whitesmoke|Hamilton Centre
|rowspan=2 |
|rowspan=2 |Stan Keyes14,94833.70%
|rowspan=2 |
|rowspan=2 |Leon Patrick O'Connor6,71415.13%
|rowspan=2 |
|rowspan=2 |David Christopherson20,32145.81%
|rowspan=2 |
|rowspan=2 |Anne Marie Pavlov1,4223.21%
|rowspan=2 |
|rowspan=2 |Stephen Downey5201.17%
|
|Michael James Baldasaro (NA)345 0.78%
|rowspan=2 |
|rowspan=2 |Stan Keyes
|-
|
|Jamilé Ghaddar (M-L)91 0.21%
|-
|rowspan=3 bgcolor=whitesmoke|Hamilton East—Stoney Creek
|rowspan=3 |
|rowspan=3|Tony Valeri18,41737.74%
|rowspan=3|
|rowspan=3|Fred Eisenberger10,88822.31%
|rowspan=3|
|rowspan=3|Tony DePaulo17,49035.84%
|rowspan=3|
|rowspan=3|Richard Safka1,4462.96%
|rowspan=3|
|rowspan=3|
|rowspan=3|
|rowspan=3|Sam Cino (Ind.)393 0.81%————Bob Mann (Comm.)166 0.34%
||
|Tony Valeri
|-
|colspan=2 align="center"|merged district
|-
||
|Sheila Copps§
|-
|bgcolor=whitesmoke|Hamilton Mountain
||
|Beth Phinney18,54834.81%
|
|Tom Jackson15,59029.26%
|
|Chris Charlton17,55232.94%
|
|Jo Pavlov1,3782.59%
|
|
|
|Paul Lane (M-L)2140.40%
||
|Beth Phinney
|-
|bgcolor=whitesmoke|Niagara Falls
|
|Victor Pietrangelo18,74536.48%
||
|Rob Nicholson19,88238.70%
|
|Wayne Gates10,68020.79%
|
|Ted Mousseau2,0714.03%
|
|
|
|
||
|Gary Pillitteri†
|-
|bgcolor=whitesmoke|Niagara West—Glanbrook
|
|Debbie Zimmerman20,21039.01%
||
|Dean Allison20,87440.29%
|
|Dave Heatley7,68114.82%
|
|Tom Ferguson1,7613.40%
|
|David Bylsma1,1072.14%
|
|Phil Rose (CAP)1790.35%
| colspan=2 align="center"|new district
|-
|rowspan=2 bgcolor=whitesmoke|St. Catharines
|rowspan=2 |
|rowspan=2 |Walt Lastewka21,27740.44%
|rowspan=2 |
|rowspan=2 |Leo Bonomi18,26134.71%
|rowspan=2 |
|rowspan=2 |Ted Mouradian10,13519.26%
|rowspan=2 |
|rowspan=2 |Jim Fannon1,9273.66%
|rowspan=2 |
|rowspan=2 |Linda Klassen7511.43%
|
|Elaine Couto (M-L)61 0.12%
|rowspan=2 |
|rowspan=2 |Walt Lastewka
|-
|
|Jane Elizabeth Paxton (CAP)204 0.39%
|-
|rowspan=3 bgcolor=whitesmoke|Welland
|rowspan=3 |
|rowspan=3|John Maloney19,64239.63%
|rowspan=3|
|rowspan=3|Mel Grunstein12,99726.22%
|rowspan=3|
|rowspan=3|Jody Di Bartolomeo14,62329.50%
|rowspan=3|
|rowspan=3|Ryan McLaughlin1,4542.93%
|rowspan=3|
|rowspan=3|Irma D. Ruiter7351.48%
|rowspan=3|
|rowspan=3|Ron Walker (M-L)1130.23%
||
|John Maloney
|-
|colspan=2 align="center"|merged district
|-
||
|Tony Tirabassi§
|}

References

Hamilton
Politics of Hamilton, Ontario